Peter David Trego (born 12 June 1981) is a former English cricketer who played primarily for Somerset. He is a right-handed batsman and right-arm medium pace bowler. He is a big hitting all-rounder who is capable of taking a one-day match away from opposing teams in the latter stages.

Career

Born June 1981 in Weston-super-Mare, Somerset, Trego made his first-class debut for Somerset in April 2000 against Oxford Universities. He took two wickets in the match, but was not required to bat. His first appearance in county cricket came two months later, playing a Norwich Union National League game against Sussex. One of the highlights of Trego's debut season came in the Scarborough Festival County Championship match against Yorkshire, where he made an unbeaten 27 batting in Somerset's first innings, followed by bowling figures of 4/84 in Yorkshire's first innings.

Towards the end of the 2000 season, Trego was selected as part of the England under-19 cricket team to play the touring Sri Lanka national under-19 cricket team. He appeared in all three One Day Internationals (ODIs), scoring a half century and taking four wickets as he did so. He also played in the first Test, scoring 90, and taking 1/48 in the match.

He is the leading runscorer in Hong Kong Sixes cricket (184 runs). He also has the record for the highest individual score in Hong Kong Sixes(65*).

In July 2019, he was selected to play for the Rotterdam Rhinos in the inaugural edition of the Euro T20 Slam cricket tournament. However, the following month the tournament was cancelled.

Trego was released by Somerset at the end of the 2019 season and signed for Nottinghamshire on a two-year contract.

He announced his retirement with immediate effect from cricket in September 2021.

Football career
Trego also plays football as a goalkeeper to a reasonable level. During the 2004–05 season, he played for Margate, and became only the third goalkeeper in the club's history to score when he found the net from a free kick within his own half. He has also played for Weston-super-Mare, Clevedon Town and Chippenham Town for whom he also scored while in goal in similar fashion to his previous one. In March 2015, he joined Bath City on non-contract forms.

Television career
In March 2016 it was announced that Trego would join the new television channel Insight TV as a presenter and narrator, after he retires from playing cricket.

Trego has also presented on RobinsTV occasionally for Bristol City.

Personal life

Peter went to Wyvern Comprehensive School, now Hans Price Academy, in Weston-super-Mare.

He is married to Claire Trego, with whom he has three children.

References

External links

Somerset County Cricket Club profile

1981 births
Living people
People from Weston-super-Mare
English cricketers
Somerset cricketers
Somerset Cricket Board cricketers
Kent cricketers
Middlesex cricketers
Herefordshire cricketers
Mashonaland cricketers
Central Districts cricketers
Marylebone Cricket Club cricketers
Sylhet Strikers cricketers
NBC Denis Compton Award recipients
English footballers
Weston-super-Mare A.F.C. players
Margate F.C. players
Chippenham Town F.C. players
National League (English football) players
Association football goalkeepers
Cornwall cricketers
Devon cricketers
Nottinghamshire cricketers